Jean-François Fournier (born 12 January 1966, in Saint-Maurice, Switzerland) is a writer, playwright, poet and biographer Vaud.

After a Degree in philosophy and letters from the Academy of Grenoble, he attended the University of Fribourg. He then decided to practice journalism and attended the Romand Training Centre for Journalists. He worked for the newspapers Le Nouveau Quotidien and Le Matin and then moved to Canada.

He was awarded the first Prize of Poetry from the Vaud Association of Writers in 1983. He received the 1988 Journalism Award from the Council of Europe, and in 1998, the canton of Valais awarded him an award for his entire literary production.

Publications
 Alcools de Vienne (novel), L'Âge d'Homme, Lausanne, 1989
 Jacques, fils du tonnerre (novel), L'Âge d'Homme, Lausanne, 1994
 Triptyque (novel), Ed. l'Hexagone, Montréal, 1998
 Acqua alta (novel), L'Âge d'Homme, Lausanne, 2000
 La nuit qui tua Juan Don (novel), L'Âge d'Homme, Lausanne, 2002
 Par-dessus le vide (poem), Ed. La Matze, Sion, 1987
 Expo.02 : c'est ça, la Suisse ? (art critique, joint work), L'Âge d'Homme, Lausanne, 2002
 Egon Schiele ou la décadence de Vienne, 1890-1918 (biography), Ed. Jean-Claude Lattès, Paris, 1992
 Jacques Villeneuve : au nom du père et du fils (biography), Ed. Chronosports, Saint-Barthélémy, 1996
 Librairie, corps et âmes (joint work), Ed. Vinci, Paris, 1993
 Ligne de métro (joint work), L'Hexagone et VLB éditeur, Montréal, 2002
 Souviens-toi, Nendaz : promenades d'écrivains (joint work), Ed. IGN, Nendaz, 2003
 Don Maifisto (theatre, with music by Henri-Louis Matter), Ed. Vinci, Paris, 1993.

References
 Anne-Lise Delacrétaz, Daniel Maggetti, Ecrivaines et écrivains d'aujourd'hui, p. 117
 Roger Francillon, Histoire de la littérature en Suisse romande, vol. 4, p. 441
 Sabine Leyat, Les auteurs du Valais romand 1975-2002, p. 67

External links
 Jean-François Fournier
 A D S - Autorinnen und Autoren der Schweiz - Autrices et Auteurs de Suisse - Autrici ed Autori della Svizzera

1966 births
Living people